The Samoa women's national rugby league team, also known as the Fetū Samoa (means Samoa Stars), represents Samoa in Women's rugby league. They are administered by the Rugby League Samoa.

Fetu Samoa has made appearances at the 2003 and 2008 Women's Rugby League World Cup's.
Samoa's last international Test Match was against the New Zealand Kiwi Ferns in June 2019, Auckland, New Zealand.

Results

Full internationals

Nines

Teams
2019 Squad
Fetu Samoa vs Kiwi Ferns
Saturday 22 June 2019
Mt Smart Stadium, Auckland, New Zealand 
Result: 8-46 (tries to Billy-Jean Ale & Moana Fineaso-Levi).
The last time Fetu Samoa played against the New Zealand Kiwi Ferns team was at the 2008 World Cup in Queensland, Australia losing that match 4-26. 
 Sieni Mose 
 Moana Fineaso-Levi
 Va'anessa Molia-Fraser
 Ricshay Lemanu
 Sarah Togatuki
 Mikayla Malaki
 Taliah Fuimaono
 Emma Young
 Cesca Luafalealo
 Elianna Walton (Captain)
 Christina Pauli
 Masuisuimatamaalii Tauaua-Pauaraisa
 Luisa Gago
 Talia Lealaiauloto
 Billy-Jean Ale
 Lauretta Leao-Seve
 Taimane Levu

Head Coach: Glenn Bailey 
Assistant Coach: Frank (Sefo) Fuimaono
Manager: Liz Akuoi-Atmore

2018 Squad
Commonwealth Nines Championship
23-24 February 2018
Moreton Bay, Brisbane, Queensland, Australia
It had been 7 years since the Fetu Samoa team last played on the international scene in 2011. In 2018, the team competed at the Women's Commonwealth Nines Championship at the Redcliffe, Queensland, Australia.  The team narrowly lost to the Australian Jillaroos in the gold medal match 8-14, coming away with a silver medal. In preparation for this, the team won the annual Cabramatta 9's International tournament in Sydney, Australia on Saturday 3 February 2018.
 Atasi Lafai (Sataua, Saipipi) 
 Cecilia Smith (Fasito'o-uta, Nofoali'i) 
 Christine Pauli (Faleasiu) 
 Christina Tagaloa (Paia, Falelatai) 
 Emma-Marie Young (Malaela) 
 Lalovi Lealaiaulto (Avau, Lufilufi, Alafua) 
 Lauretta Leao-Seve (Fagali'i) 
 Luisa Gago (Avao, Fagaloa) 
 Maitua Feterika (Solosolo, Lufilufi) 
 Mikayla Malaki (Levi, Saleimoa, Falease'ela, Manono, Fasito'o) 
 Oneata Schwalger (Lalovaea, Saleaaumua) 
 Sarah Togatuki Nogotau (Satalo Falealili, Leulumoega, Nofoalii) 
 Shontelle Stowers (Lago) 
 Talia Lealaiauloto (Avau, Lufilufi, Alafua) 
 Taliah Fuimaono (Nofoali’i, Vailuutai) 
Standbys:
 Kristine Vaalepu (Saleimua, Salaaumua) 
 Liiah Tagaloa (Paia, Falelatai) 
Coach: Frank (Sefo) Fuimaono (Fatausi, Safotulafai)
Trainers: Rodney Hall (Toamua, Fasito’o-uta), Anjalee Howlett
Physio: Braydon Vo
Manager: Sally Va'afusuaga (Faleāse’ela, Tuana’i, Tanugamanono)

2011 Squad
Fetu Samoa squad that played in a test match against the Jillaroos on 1 September 2011 in Apia, Samoa:

Luisa Avaiki (c)
Tolupene (Neta) Peau
Theresa Malaitai
Mele Angelia Leuluaialii
Kally Leota
Marie Frances Leota
Seeseei Hellen Tafa
Sharon Jacinta Chungson
Cynthia Taala
Madonna Seifono Schmidt
Victoria Apulu
Sarah Faasegi Clayton

Chloe Leaupepe
Billy-Jean Ale
Valerie Leataata Davis
Alaiumu Sao Taliu
Aieshaleigh Smalley
Tasia Seumanufagai
Vicki Lee Nafanua Campbell
Foaiina Maria Chong Nee
Tuiai Elisara
Karameli Tiffany Faaee
Unaloto Sili
Maitua Feterika

2008 World Cup Squad
The tournament was held in Australia from 26 October, culminating in the final between Australia and New Zealand on 22 November. It was held at Stockland Park alongside the Police World Cup. Eight teams took part including defending champions New Zealand.

 Marie Leota
 Esther Fuaivaa
 Jean Oti
 Maryann Collins
 Mele Leuluaiali'i
 Ake Pereira
 Kally Leota
 Tolupene (Neta) Peau (Vice Captain)
 Maryanne Hemara
 Iriana Huriwai-Sasulu
 Sera Clayton (Captain)
 Theresa Malaitai
 Rachael Efaraimo
 Tunufa'i Poulava
 Serena Curtis-Lemuelu
 Laine Faapito
 Fuarosa Time
 Poto Lemalu-Tuisamoa
 Maima Tiatia
  
 Mate Lefale
 Justine Lavea
 Tatiana Tafatu
Head Coach: Tavita Solomona
Manager: Jo Toleafoa
Trainer / Secretary: May Afoa-Peterson
Support Staff: Daisy Va'afusuaga
Executive: Sally Va'afusuaga
Tour Manager: Tagaloa Fouina Su'a
Samoan Official: Unasa Lautofa

Coaches
 2019 Glenn Brailey
 2018 Frank Fuimaono
 2011 Frank Fuimaono
 2008 Tavita Solomona

Records

Team

Individual

See also

Rugby league in Samoa
Samoa national rugby league team

Sources

References

External links

W
Women's national rugby league teams
Rugby league in Samoa
Rugby league